Gérard Battaglia (26 March 1937 – 2 March 2015) was a former sailor who represented Monaco at two Olympic Games in sailing.

Career 

Alongside Jean-Pierre Crovetto and Jules Soccal Battaglia finished 23rd in the Dragon class at the 1960 Olympic Games. He won a bronze medal with Crovetto at the 1963 Mediterranean Games. In the 1976 Olympic Games he finished 23rd in the soling class with Borro and Claude Rossi.

Personal life 

His son Philippe and nephew René Battaglia both competed for Monaco in the Olympics.

He later became president of the Monegasque Sailing Federation and an Officer of the Order of Saint-Charles.

References 

1937 births
2015 deaths
Olympic sailors of Monaco
Sailors at the 1960 Summer Olympics – Dragon
Sailors at the 1976 Summer Olympics – Soling
Competitors at the 1963 Mediterranean Games
Officers of the Order of Saint-Charles
Monegasque male sailors (sport)
Mediterranean Games competitors for Monaco
Mediterranean Games bronze medalists for Monaco
Snipe class sailors
Mediterranean Games medalists in sailing